Her Ay ("Every month") was a Turkish magazine published monthly in Istanbul between March 1937 and March 1938. It was established by Orhan Seyfi Orhon (1890-1972) and Yusuf Ziya Ortaç (1895-1967). A total of seven issues featured contributions from major Turkish writers, such as Mustafa Şekip Tunç (1886-1958), Hasan Ali Yücel (1897-1961), and Sabahattin Ali (1907-1948). Due to its content, the periodical is one of the most important of its time.

References

1937 establishments in Turkey
1938 disestablishments in Turkey
Defunct literary magazines
Defunct magazines published in Turkey
Magazines established in 1937
Magazines disestablished in 1938
Magazines published in Istanbul
Turkish-language magazines
Monthly magazines published in Turkey
Literary magazines published in Turkey